Andreas Kolovouris (born 6 April 1992) is a Greek professional footballer who plays as a goalkeeper for Super League 2 club Panachaiki.

References

1992 births
Living people
Greek footballers
Super League Greece players
Football League (Greece) players
Super League Greece 2 players
Gamma Ethniki players
Kalamata F.C. players
Panetolikos F.C. players
PAE Kerkyra players
Panachaiki F.C. players
Episkopi F.C. players
Enosi Panaspropyrgiakou Doxas players
Association football goalkeepers
Footballers from Patras